Antonieliton Ferreira de Arruda (born 10 August 1983 in Campina Grande, Paraíba), known as Ferreira, is a Brazilian professional footballer who plays for Sport Lagoa Seca as a right back.

External links

1983 births
Living people
People from Campina Grande
Brazilian footballers
Association football defenders
Primeira Liga players
Liga Portugal 2 players
Segunda Divisão players
FC Porto B players
FC Porto players
Gil Vicente F.C. players
C.S. Marítimo players
F.C. Paços de Ferreira players
Portimonense S.C. players
Campeonato Brasileiro Série C players
Campeonato Brasileiro Série D players
Esporte Clube São Bento players
Treze Futebol Clube players
América Futebol Clube (RN) players
Botafogo Futebol Clube (PB) players
Central Sport Club players
Grêmio Recreativo Serrano players
Brazilian expatriate footballers
Expatriate footballers in Portugal
Brazilian expatriate sportspeople in Portugal
Sportspeople from Paraíba